Shemroy Barrington (born 20 January 1988) is a Guyanese cricketer. He played in seven first-class matches for Guyana from 2009 to 2011.

See also
 List of Guyanese representative cricketers

References

External links
 

1988 births
Living people
Guyanese cricketers
Guyana cricketers